"The Brass Guitar" is the seventh television play episode of the second season of the Australian anthology television series Australian Playhouse. "The Brass Guitar" was written by Oriel Gray and originally aired on ABC on 31 July 1967 in Melbourne and on 4 September 1967 in Sydney,

Plot
Toby Campbell, a pop idol, loves both wife and brass guitar, but the idol of success demands that one be sacrificed.

Cast
 Martin McGee
 Terry McDermott
 Lyndell Rowe

Reception
The Bulletin called it "a fussy, fancy, rather desperate essay into quirky humor which failed mainly because it needed sharp dialogue but had nothing more original than, "This boy has nightmares that could win Melbourne Cups." In its favor: Alan Clarke's op art set, and Terry McDermott's appearance as a raincoated, very Orstralian detective."

See also
 List of television plays broadcast on Australian Broadcasting Corporation (1960s)

References

External links
 
 
 
 Complete script at National Archives of Australia

1967 television plays
1967 Australian television episodes
1960s Australian television plays
Australian Playhouse (season 2) episodes
Black-and-white television episodes